The Kerala Sahitya Akademi Award for Miscellaneous Works was an award given every year by the Kerala Sahitya Akademi (Kerala Literary Academy) to Malayalam writers for writing miscellaneous works of literary merit. It was one of the  categories of the Kerala Sahitya Akademi Award. The award was established in 1969 and was discontinued from the year 1991, since many new categories were added in 1992.

Awardees

References

Awards established in 1969
Awards disestablished in 1991
Kerala Sahitya Akademi Awards
Malayalam literary awards
1969 establishments in Kerala
1991 disestablishments in India